Touro University Nevada (TUN) is a private university in Henderson, Nevada. It is part of the Touro College and University System. Touro University Nevada is a branch campus of its sister campus Touro University California.

History
Touro University Nevada was established to help address critical needs in health care and education, and as a resource for community service in Nevada. A non-profit, Jewish-sponsored, private institution affiliated with an international system of higher education, the university opened in 2004 with 78 medical students. Touro University Nevada is home to more than 1,300 students in a wide range of degree programs in osteopathic medicine, nursing, physical therapy, occupational therapy, physician assistant studies, camp administration and education. Many of these programs are the first of their kind in Nevada. The College of Osteopathic Medicine was Nevada's first osteopathic medical school and the state’s second medical school.

Academics
TUN has two colleges
College of Health and Human Services
College of Osteopathic Medicine

The College of Osteopathic Medicine at Touro University Nevada is accredited by the American Osteopathic Association's Commission on Osteopathic College Accreditation (COCA). The World Directory of Medical Schools lists the school as a US medical school along with other accredited US MD and DO programs. Touro University Nevada has also received accreditation from the Nevada Commission on Postsecondary Education, the American Physical Therapy Association's Commission on Accreditation in Physical Therapy Education, and the American Occupational Therapy Association's Accreditation Council for Occupational Therapy Education.

Graduate medical education
Touro University Nevada is the academic sponsor of Valley Hospital’s graduate medical residency program, providing training opportunities for Touro students and post-graduate education for medical residents.

The program currently includes 16 traditional internships – slots for first year trainees who will ultimately progress into other specialties; the largest single internal medicine residency program in the osteopathic medical profession (45 slots); family medicine residency program, an orthopedic surgery residency program, an ophthalmology residency program, the only dermatology residency program, and a neurology residency program.

Touro University Nevada received a $1.2 million state grant to fund a one-year geriatric medicine fellowship.  The program is expected to launch in July 2017.

Community resources
Center for Autism and Developmental Disabilities
Developed to address a growing community need, Touro University Nevada’s Center for Autism and Developmental Disabilities is a multi-disciplinary, one-stop source for diagnostic services, therapy and supportive resources for families dealing with autism and other developmental disorders.  This team approach affords individualized treatment programs based on each child’s individual needs. The center also serves as a learning laboratory for university students across the disciplines.

Active Aging Center - Expected to break ground in Dec. 2013, this clinic will provide unique care to the local geriatric population.

Touro Health Center
The university has also recently opened its first full-service patient clinic, staffed by practicing faculty members and open to the community. The medical clinic provides on-site learning opportunities for students, as well as a venue for future clinical research trials.   An expanded patient clinic is planned for the next phase of the university’s build-out.

Physical Therapy Clinic
Recently, Touro University Nevada opened a free physical therapy clinic run by TUN physical therapy students that are supervised by licensed physical therapy faculty.

Research
Touro University Nevada faculty specialize in a wide range of basic and applied research in fields including: autism, cardiovascular physiology, cell biology, evolutionary biology, infectious diseases, neuroscience, osteopathic manipulative medicine, oncology, regenerative medicine, and women's health. Research conducted at Touro University Nevada has been funded by grants from the National Institute of Allergy and Infectious Diseases and the Schultz Engel Purpose Trust.

Facilities
To accommodate growth and focus resources on academic needs, Touro University Nevada purchased two existing, flexible shell buildings within Henderson’s Black Mountain Business Parks. Touro University Nevada currently occupies  the first building with classrooms and laboratories, offices, a university library, common spaces and clinics.  The university will more than double its space with the next expansion of building one, adding . Building two is currently occupied by rental tenants, and holds  of space that the university may use for growth.

See also
 List of medical schools in the United States

References

External links
Official website

Education in Henderson, Nevada
Jews and Judaism in Nevada
Private universities and colleges in Nevada
Educational institutions established in 2004
Medical schools in Nevada
Osteopathic medical schools in the United States
Universities and colleges in Clark County, Nevada
Touro University System
2004 establishments in Nevada